The NWL Cruiserweight Championship is the top professional wrestling Cruiserweight title in the National Wrestling League promotion. It was created on December 13, 1997, when Fumar defeated Shorty Smalls in Moorefield, West Virginia to become the first champion. The title is defended primarily in the Mid-Atlantic and East Coast, most often in Hagerstown, Maryland, but also in Pennsylvania and West Virginia. There are 16 recognized known champions with a total of 50 title reigns.

Title history

NWL Cruiserweight Championship

NWL/HoPWF Luchadore Championship

References

Cruiserweight wrestling championships